Malesfelsen is a mountain of the Swabian Jura in Germany. It is located at the edge of the Großer Heuberg plateau above the Schmiecha valley in Albstadt.
   

Albstadt
Mountains and hills of the Swabian Jura